Raymond G. Stokes Ph.D FAcSS, (Born 1956, Pittsburgh), is an American academic historian and the current Chair of Business History and Director of the Centre for Business History in Scotland at the University of Glasgow.

Early life
Raymond G. Stokes was born in 1956. He holds a Ph.D from the Ohio State University.

Career
Stokes taught at Case Western Reserve University and the Rensselaer Polytechnic Institute, where he received tenure. In 1995, he joined the University of Glasgow.

Stokes has been the President of the European Business History Association, the Editor-in-Chief of the Zeitschrift für Untenehmensgeschichte, and served on the Council of the Association of Business Historians. He recently served as Editor-in-Chief of the leading journal in the field, Business History. He is the author or co-author of seven books, some of which have been written in, or translated into, German.

Stokes is the director of the Centre for Business History in Scotland (CBH), Scotland’s only research unit in the discipline, with 13 full members engaged in teaching and research. The prime objective of the CBH is to encourage, facilitate and conduct research in all aspects of business history, with particular emphasis on corporate governance, innovation and organisational change. CBH was established following thirty years of investment in business history, which culminated in 1987 in the founding and funding of centre and library within the Department of Economic and Social history at Glasgow University. Tony Slaven was appointed as the inaugural Director of the Centre, also holding the Chair in Business History. Notably, CBH was one of the first permanently funded research centres, and consequently independent of the need to secure funds by accepting commissioned business histories. Stokes succeeded Slaven upon the latter's retirement in 2005.

His research interests are primarily in German Business History, in particular business during the Third Reich, and comparisons of technology, innovation and the environment in Germany and America from 1933 to 1990. Most recently he has made headlines for a project examining the links between Thalidomide and Nazi Germany.

Works
Stokes, R. G., and Banken, R. (2016) Building On Air: The International Industrial Gases Industry, 1886-2006. Cambridge University Press 
Stokes, R.G., Köster, R., and Sambrook, S. (2013) The Business of Waste: Great Britain and Germany, 1945 to the Present. Cambridge University Press. 
Abelshauser, W., Von Hippel, W., Johnson, J.A., and Stokes, R.G. (2004) German Industry and Global Enterprise. BASF: the History of a Company. Cambridge University Press. 
Karlsch, R., and Stokes, R.G. (2003) Faktor Öl: die Mineralölwirtschaft in Deutschland von 1859 bis 1974. Beck. 
Stokes, R.G., (2000) Constructing Socialism: Technology and Change in East Germany, 1945-1990. Johns Hopkins University Press. .
Stokes, R.G., (1994) Opting for Oil: The Political Economy of Technological Change in the West German Industry, 1945–1961. Cambridge University Press. 
Stokes, R.G., (1988) Divide and Prosper: The Heirs of I.G. Farben Under Allied Authority, 1945-1951. University of California Press.

References

British historians
21st-century American historians
21st-century American male writers
Business historians
Ohio State University people
Academics of the University of Glasgow
Fellows of the Academy of Social Sciences
Living people
1956 births
American male non-fiction writers